The Norwegian Biathlon Association (NSSF) was founded 10 December 1983 and is a Norwegian association for biathlon, and is a member of the Norwegian Olympic and Paralympic Committee and Confederation of Sports and the International Biathlon Union.

See also 
 Norwegian Biathlon Championships

Other shooting sport organizations in Norway 
 Det frivillige Skyttervesen
 Norwegian Shooting Association
 Dynamic Sports Shooting Norway
 Norwegian Association of Hunters and Anglers
 Norwegian Benchrest Shooting Association
 Norwegian Black Powder Union
 Norwegian Metal Silhouette Association
 Scandinavian Western Shooters

References

External links 
 

1983 establishments in Norway
Biathlon
Organizations established in 1983
Biathlon in Norway
Biathlon organizations